The El Campo Independent School District is a public school district based in El Campo, Texas, United States.

The district serves El Campo as well as rural areas in central and south central Wharton County.

In 2009, the school district was rated "academically acceptable" by the Texas Education Agency.

Mark Pool was the superintendent until sometime in 2015. In January of that year, the district began searching for a new superintendent. By April the only finalist for the position was Kelly Waters, the ECISD assistant superintendent of curriculum and instruction, and a member of the El Campo High School Class of 1984. The district's board of education voted 7-0 to hire her.

Schools
El Campo High School  (Grades 9-12)
El Campo Middle School (Grades 6-8)
Northside Elementary School (Grades 4-5)
Hutchins Elementary School (Grades 2-3)
Myatt Elementary School (Grades PK-1)

References

External links
 
El Campo ISD (Archive)

School districts in Wharton County, Texas